Haverhill South railway station was located in Haverhill, Suffolk. It was a terminus on the Colne Valley and Halstead Railway.

In 1924 passenger services were diverted to Haverhill North (on the Stour Valley Railway) which also served the town, but Haverhill South continued to be served by freight trains until 1965.

Since closure the station has been demolished and the site redeveloped.

References

External links
 Haverhill South station on navigable 1946 O. S. map. The station was located just above the "i" in Haverhill.
 

Disused railway stations in Suffolk
Former Colne Valley and Halstead Railway stations
Railway stations in Great Britain opened in 1863
Railway stations in Great Britain closed in 1924
Haverhill, Suffolk